Joseph Xing Wenzhi (born 1963) is an auxiliary bishop in the Diocese of Shanghai.

Background
In 2005, Pope John Paul II. named Xing auxiliary bishop in the Diocese of Shanghai and confirmed by Pope Benedict XVI. Bishop Aloysius Jin Luxian consecrated him bishop on June 28, 2005. He was recognized by both Pope Benedict XVI. and the Chinese government. He was regarded the designated successor of Aloysius Jin Luxian, until he disappeared by the end of 2011. Msgr. Thaddeus Ma Daqin became his successor in July 2012.

See also
List of people who disappeared

References

1963 births
2010s missing person cases
21st-century Roman Catholic bishops in China
Enforced disappearances in China
Missing people
Missing person cases in China
Roman Catholic bishops in Shanghai